Rolla Senior High School is a public secondary school located in Rolla, Missouri, United States. The school's mascot is the Bulldog with the colors of maroon and silver (formerly maroon, gray, and gold). The high school offers many clubs, including Student Council (StuCo) as part of Missouri Associations of Student Councils, Key Club, Octagon Club, DECA, FBLA, FFA, FCCLA, TSA, Math Club, Chess Club, Improvisation Club, Spanish Club, German Club, French Club, Latin Club, and the new addition Link Crew and HOSA Future Health Professionals. There are two student publications at RHS: The Growler yearbook and The Echo newspaper.

History 
Among the high school's predecessor buildings was the Rolla Building that opened in 1871.  It was shared with the Missouri School of Mines and Metallurgy in its first year of existence. The college bought the building for $25,000 in 1875 and it remains in use as the school's mathematics library after being extensively renovated.

The present school dates to 1921. In 1989 an addition was made to the high school which nearly doubled its classrooms. Another addition was constructed during the 2016–17 school year to accommodate the mathematics department. For the most part the hard sciences remain in the older portions of the building and other subjects are dispersed in between halls.

The high school started the 2008–2009 year with a new principal, Mr. Nathan Hoven, after the previous principal Dr. Roger Berkbuegler retired after 28 years as the principal of Rolla Senior High School.  The current principal is Dr. Jim Pritchett.

Athletics 
Rolla High School's Bulldog Athletic teams compete year-round.

Fall sports
Boys Cross Country
Boys Soccer
Boys Football
Girls Cross Country
Girls Volleyball
Girls Golf
Girls Softball
Girls Tennis
Girls Football Cheerleading
Marching Band (including Color Guard)
Winter sports
BoysWrestling
Girls Wrestling
Boys Basketball
Girls Basketball
Girls Winter Cheerleading sports
Spring Sports
Boys Baseball
Boys Tennis
Boys Golf
Boys Track and Field
Girls Track and Field
Girls Soccer
Winter Guard

AP courses offered 
AP Java (AP Computer Science A)
AP European History
AP Calculus AB
AP Chemistry
AP Psychology
AP English Literature and Composition
AP English Language and Composition
AP Music Theory
AP Biology
AP United States Government and Politics
AP United States History
Other AP tests can be taken at the behest of students. Students have been known to study on their own and do exceedingly well on AP tests such as AP Macro/Micro Econ, and AP Calculus BC have all been administered without the class being offered.

Notable alumni
 Robin Carnahan, former Missouri Secretary of State
 Russ Carnahan, currently serving in the U.S. House of Representatives from Missouri's 3rd district
 Chantae McMillan, heptathlete competing at the 2012 Summer Olympics

References

External links 

Public high schools in Missouri
Schools in Phelps County, Missouri